The 2004 IIHF World U18 Championships were held in Minsk, Belarus. The championships began on April 8, 2004, and finished on April 18, 2004. Games were played at the Ice Palace and Palace sport in Minsk. Russia defeated the United States 3–2 in the final to claim the gold medal, while the Czech Republic defeated Canada 3–2 to capture the bronze medal.

Championship results

Preliminary round

Group A

Group B

Relegation round

Final round

Bracket

Quarterfinals

Semifinals

Fifth place game

Bronze medal game

Final

Final standings

Statistics

Scoring leaders

GP = Games played; G = Goals; A = Assists; Pts = Points; +/− = Plus-minus; PIM = Penalties in minutesSource: IIHF

Goaltending leaders
(minimum 40% team's total ice time)

TOI = Time On Ice (minutes:seconds); GA = Goals against; GAA = Goals against average; SA = Shots against; Sv% = Save percentage; SO = ShutoutsSource: IIHF

Awards
Best players selected by the Directorate:
Best Goaltender:  Marek Schwarz
Best Defenceman:  Zach Jones
Best Forward:  Evgeni Malkin
Source: IIHF

Media All-Stars:
Goaltender:  Anton Khudobin
Defencemen:  Andy Rogers /  Ladislav Šmíd
Forwards:  Liam Reddox /  Evgeni Malkin /  Phil Kessel

Division I

Division I consisted of two separate tournaments. The Group A tournament was held between 27 March and 2 April 2004 in Amstetten, Austria and the Group B tournament was held between 29 March and 4 April 2004 in Asiago, Italy. Switzerland and Germany won the Group A and Group B tournaments respectively and gained promotion to the Championship Division for the 2005 IIHF World U18 Championships. While Romania finished last in Group A and South Korea last in Group B and were both relegated to Division II for 2005.

Final standings

Group A
 — promoted to the Championship Division for 2005

 — relegated to Division II for 2004

Group B
 — promoted to the Championship Division for 2004

 — relegated to Division II for 2004

Division II

Division II consisted of two separate tournaments. The Group A tournament was held between 28 March and 3 April 2004 in Debrecen, Hungary and the Group B tournament was held  between 1 and 7 March 2004 in Elektrėnai and Kaunas, Lithuania. Ukraine and Great Britain won the Group A and Group B tournaments respectively and gained promotion to Division I for the 2005 IIHF World U18 Championships. While Belgium finished last in Group A and Australia last in Group B and were both relegated to Division III for 2005.

Final standings

Group A
 — promoted to Division I for 2005

 — relegated to Division III for 2005

Group B
 — promoted to Division I for 2005

 Serbia and Montenegro
 — relegated to Division III for 2005

Division III

The Division III tournament was held between 6 and 14 March 2004 in Sofia, Bulgaria. Mexico and South Africa finished first and second respectively and both gained promotion to Division II for the 2005 IIHF World U18 Championships. While Turkey and Bosnia and Herzegovina finished sixth and seventh respectively and were relegated to the Division III Qualification tournament for 2005.

Final standings
 — promoted to Division II for 2005
 — promoted to Division II for 2005

 — relegated to Division III Qualification for 2005
 — relegated to Division III Qualification for 2005

References

External links
Official Championship results and statistics

 
IIHF World U18 Championships
IIHF World U18 Championships
2003
World
April 2004 sports events in Europe
Sports competitions in Minsk
2000s in Minsk